Gōdo Station is the name of three train stations in Japan:

 Gōdo Station (Fukushima) (郷戸駅)
 Gōdo Station (Gifu) (顔戸駅)
 Gōdo Station (Gunma) (神戸駅)